Marianne Raigipcien Jean-Baptiste (born 26 April 1967) is an English actress. She is known for her role in the 1996 comedy-drama film Secrets & Lies, for which she received acclaim and earned nominations for the Academy Award for Best Supporting Actress and the Golden Globe and BAFTA Award in the same category. Baptiste is also known for her role as Vivian Johnson on the television series Without a Trace from 2002 to 2009, and has since starred in television shows such as Blindspot (2015–2016) and Homecoming (2018).

Early life
Jean-Baptiste was born in London to a mother from Antigua and a father from Saint Lucia, growing up in Peckham. She attended St Saviour's and St Olave's secondary school. She was classically trained at the Royal Academy of Dramatic Art in London and performed at the Royal National Theatre. She was nominated for a 1994 Ian Charleson Award for her performance in William Shakespeare's Measure For Measure with theatre company Cheek by Jowl.

Career

Jean-Baptiste gained international acclaim for the Mike Leigh-directed social drama Secrets & Lies (1996), receiving both Golden Globe and Academy Award for Best Supporting Actress nominations for her performance, becoming the first black British actress to be nominated for an Academy Award and the second black Briton to be nominated, succeeding Jaye Davidson. She had previously collaborated with Leigh onstage in It's a Great Big Shame (1993). She caused controversy when she accused the film industry of racism, noting that leading actors had been asked to attend the Cannes Film Festival, but despite her success, she was not invited.

A writer and composer, Jean-Baptiste recorded an album of blues songs and composed the musical score for Leigh's 1997 film Career Girls. In 1999, she performed in Paris in a French-language production by Peter Brook of The Suit, a one-act play by Barney Simon and Mothobi Mutloatse, based on the short story by Can Themba. She was also acclaimed for her role as Doreen Lawrence in The Murder of Stephen Lawrence (1999).

Jean-Baptiste relocated for work reasons to the U.S. and lives in Los Angeles with her husband and two daughters. She honed her American accent and starred in the American television series Without a Trace as FBI agent Vivian Johnson. More recently, the actress has appeared in such films as Takers (2010), Secrets in the Walls (2010) and Harry's Law (2012). She played Detroit police chief Karen Dean in RoboCop (2014).

She was praised for her stage performance in the 2013 National Theatre production of James Baldwin's play The Amen Corner, directed by Rufus Norris.

As a friend of Angela Bassett, Jean-Baptiste attended Women's Image Network Awards and on Bassett's behalf picked up an award, reading Bassett's poetic acceptance speech for her winning role in the 2013 film Betty & Coretta.

Filmography

Film

Television

Other projects, contributions
When Love Speaks (2002, EMI Classics) – "Sonnet 15" ("When I consider everything that grows...")

References

External links
 
 

1967 births
Alumni of RADA
Black British actresses
English expatriates in the United States
English film actresses
English people of Antigua and Barbuda descent
English people of Saint Lucian descent
English stage actresses
English television actresses
English voice actresses
English women film directors
British women television directors
Living people
Actresses from London
People from Camberwell
English Shakespearean actresses
20th-century English actresses
21st-century English actresses